Alessa-Catriona Pröpster (born 4 March 2001) is a German professional track cyclist. In October 2021, she won the silver medal in the women's team sprint event at the 2021 UEC European Track Championships.

References

External links
 

2001 births
Living people
German female cyclists
People from Hechingen
Sportspeople from Tübingen (region)
Cyclists from Baden-Württemberg